The National Solidarity Party  (PSN) was a political party in Guatemala.

In the general election held on 9 November 2003, the party was part of the Grand National Alliance (GANA). In the legislative election, GANA won 24.3% of the vote, and 47 out of 158 seats in Congress. The presidential candidate of the alliance, Óscar Berger Perdomo, won 34.3% at the presidential elections of the same day. He won 54.1% at the second round and was elected president.

In November 2005, following the withdrawal of the other two member parties from GANA, the PSN ceded its registration as a political party to the Grand National Alliance. In effect, the PSN became the GANA.

Conservative parties in Guatemala
Defunct political parties in Guatemala
Political parties with year of disestablishment missing
Political parties with year of establishment missing